Cormac Costello (born 18 July 1994) is a Gaelic football forward for the Dublin county team, with which he has won three All-Ireland Senior Football Championship medals and four National Football League medals. The former Ardscoil Rís student plays his club football for Whitehall Colmcille.

Costello won an All-Ireland Minor Football Championship in 2012, then an All-Ireland Under 21 Football Championship in May 2014. In 2014, he was a sub in the quarter-final victory over Laois in the Leinster Senior Championship. He scored three points in the game. During the semi-final victory over Wexford he was a sub again and he scored 1-05. He won a Leinster Senior Championship against Meath in 2014. He was a sub and scored one point in the game. In the All-Ireland quarter-final Costello was a sub again and managed one point in a one-sided game against Monaghan. He was selected at corner forward against Donegal but Dublin crashed out in the semi-final.

On 1 October 2016, Costello came off the bench and scored three points as Dublin won the All-Ireland final after a replay with Mayo.

Honours
 All-Ireland Senior Football Championship (6): 2013, 2015, 2016, 2017, 2018, 2019
 National Football League (5): 2013, 2014, 2015, 2016, 2018,
 Leinster Senior Football Championship (6): 2013, 2014, 2015, 2016, 2017, 2018, 2019
 All-Ireland Under-21 Football Championship (1): 2014
 Leinster Under-21 Football Championship (2), 2014, 2015
 All-Ireland Minor Football Championship (1): 2012
 Leinster Minor Football Championship (2): 2011, 2012
 Leinster Minor Hurling Championship (2): 2011, 2012

References

1994 births
Living people
Australian Gaelic footballers
Dual players
DCU Gaelic footballers
Dublin inter-county Gaelic footballers
Gaelic football forwards
Irish schoolteachers
Whitehall Colmcille Gaelic footballers
Winners of seven All-Ireland medals (Gaelic football)